Rhigognostis hufnagelii is a moth belonging to the family Plutellidae. The species was first described by Zeller in 1839.

It is native to Europe.

References

Plutellidae